Criorhina rostrata is a species of hoverfly in the family Syrphidae.

Distribution
China.

References

Eristalinae
Diptera of Asia
Insects described in 2020